The Cronak process is a conventional chromate conversion coating process developed in 1933 by The New Jersey Zinc Company. It involves immersing a zinc or zinc-plated article for 5 to 15 seconds in a chromate solution, typically prepared from sodium dichromate and sulfuric acid. The process was patented in the United States on March 24, 1936 with USPTO number 2,035,380.

References

External links
 https://web.archive.org/web/20141211093127/http://www.innovateus.net/science/what-zinc-chromate-used

Chemical processes